Victor Patrick Frazier (August 5, 1904 – January 10, 1977) was an American professional baseball player. He played in Major League Baseball as a right-handed pitcher from 1931 to 1939 for the Chicago White Sox, Detroit Tigers, and Boston Bees. He was born in Ruston, Louisiana.

In a six-season career, Frazier posted a 23–38 record with a 5.77 earned run average in 126 appearances, including 68 starts, 21 complete games, 25 games finished, four saves, 170 strikeouts, 291 walks, and 579 innings. 
 
Frazier died in Jacksonville, Texas, at age 72.

References

External links

1904 births
1977 deaths
Major League Baseball pitchers
Chicago White Sox players
Detroit Tigers players
Boston Bees players
Baseball players from Louisiana
Sportspeople from Ruston, Louisiana